AM-1241 (1-(methylpiperidin-2-ylmethyl)-3-(2-iodo-5-nitrobenzoyl)indole) is a chemical from the aminoalkylindole family that acts as a potent and selective agonist for the cannabinoid receptor CB2, with a Ki of 3.4 nM at CB2 and 80 times selectivity over the related CB1 receptor. It has analgesic effects in animal studies, particularly against "atypical" pain such as hyperalgesia and allodynia. This is thought to be mediated through CB2-mediated peripheral release of endogenous opioid peptides, as well as direct activation of the TRPA1 channel. It has also shown efficacy in the treatment of amyotrophic lateral sclerosis in animal models.

Effects in bone cancer model
The antihyperalgesic effects of AM-1241 were investigated in a murine bone cancer model. Sarcoma cells were injected into the femur of a mouse, and then mice were injected twice daily with AM-1241. Treatment with AM-1241 reduced both spontaneous and evoked pain, as well as reducing the bone loss and subsequent fractures due to the tumor. Pretreatment with the CB2 antagonist SR-144,528 reversed the acute effects of AM-1241 on both spontaneous and evoked pain, while having no effect on its own.

See also 
 AM-1220
 AM-1248
 AM-2233

References 

Aminoalkylindoles
Benzoylindoles
Piperidines
Nitrobenzenes
Iodoarenes
AM cannabinoids
Designer drugs